In graph theory, a rainbow-independent set (ISR) is an independent set in a graph, in which each vertex has a different color.

Formally, let  be a graph, and suppose vertex set  is partitioned into  subsets , called "colors". A set  of vertices is called a rainbow-independent set if it satisfies both the following conditions:

 It is a rainbow set –  contains at most a single vertex from each color .

Other terms used in the literature are independent set of representatives, independent transversal, and independent system of representatives.

As an example application, consider a faculty with  departments, where some faculty members dislike each other. The dean wants to construct a committee with  members, one member per department, but without any pair of members who dislike each other. This problem can be presented as finding an ISR in a graph in which the nodes are the faculty members, the edges describe the "dislike" relations, and the subsets   are the departments.

Variants 
It is assumed for convenience that the sets  are pairwise-disjoint.

ISR generalizes the concept of a system of distinct representatives (SDR, also known as transversal). Every transversal is an ISR where in the underlying graph, all and only copies of the same vertex from different sets are connected.

Existence of rainbow-independent sets 
There are various sufficient conditions for the existence of an ISR.

Condition based on vertex degree 
Intuitively, when the departments  are larger, and there is less conflict between faculty members, an ISR should be more likely to exist. The "less conflict" condition is represented by the vertex degree of the graph. The  is best possible: there are graph with vertex degree  and colors of size  without an ISR.

Condition based on dominating sets 
The following theorem describes the structure of graphs that have no ISR but are edge-minimal, in the sense that whenever any edge is removed from them, the remaining graph has an ISR.

 The set of vertices adjacent to  dominates ;
 ;
  is a matching – no two edges of it are adjacent to the same vertex.

Hall-type condition 
Figuratively,  is a team of "neutral members" for the set  of departments, that can augment any sufficiently small set of non-conflicting members, to create a larger such set. The theorem is proved using Sperner's lemma. The standard simplex with  endpoints is assigned a triangulation with some special properties. Each endpoint  of the simplex is associated with the color-set , each face  of the simplex is associated with a set  of colors. By Sperner's lemma, there exists a sub-simplex in which, for each point ,  belongs to a different color-set; the set of these  is an ISR.

The above theorem implies Hall's marriage condition.

Let  be a bipartite graph satisfying Hall's condition. Let  be a set of  such edges. The above theorem implies that  has a rainbow matching .

For every subset  of colors, the graph  contains at least  vertices, and it is a union of cycles of length divisible by 3 and paths. Let  be an independent set in  containing every third vertex in each cycle and each path. So  contains at least  vertices. By the previous theorem,  has an ISR.

Condition based on homological connectivity 
One family of conditions is based on the homological connectivity of the independence complex of subgraphs. To state the conditions, the following notation is used:

  denotes the independence complex of a graph  (that is, the abstract simplicial complex whose faces are the independent sets in ).

If, for all subsets  of :

In this case  so there are four options for :

 then  is a graph with vertices  and no edges. It is known that a single simplex is -connected for all integers , since all its reduced homology groups are trivial (see simplicial homology). Hence the condition holds.
 this case is analogous to the previous one.
Thus, in this case, the condition of the theorem is not only sufficient but also necessary.

Other conditions 
Every properly coloured triangle-free graph of chromatic number  contains a rainbow-independent set of size at least .

Several authors have studied conditions for existence of large rainbow-independent sets in various classes of graphs.

Computation 
The ISR decision problem is the problem of deciding whether a given graph  and a given partition of  into  colors admits a rainbow-independent set. This problem is NP-complete. The proof is by reduction from the 3-dimensional matching problem (3DM). An input to 3DM can be converted into an input to ISR as follows:

In the resulting graph , an ISR corresponds to a set of triplets  such that:

 Each triplet has a different  value (since each triplet belongs to a different color-set );
 Each triplet has a different  value and a different  value (since the vertices are independent).

Therefore, the resulting graph admits an ISR if and only if the original hypergraph admits a 3DM.

An alternative proof is by reduction from SAT.

Related concepts 
See also matching in hypergraphs.

Another related concept is a rainbow cycle, which is a cycle in which each vertex has a different color.

When an ISR exists, a natural question is whether there exist other ISRs, such that the entire set of vertices is partitioned into disjoint ISRs (assuming the number of vertices in each color is the same). Such a partition is called strong coloring.

Using the faculty metaphor:

 A system of distinct representatives is a committee of distinct members, with or without conflicts.
 An independent set is a committee with no conflict.
 An independent transversal is a committee with no conflict, with exactly one member from each department.
 A graph coloring is a partitioning of the faculty members into committees with no conflict.
 A strong coloring is a partitioning of the faculty members into committees with no conflict and with exactly one member from each department. Thus this problem is sometimes called the happy dean problem.
A rainbow clique or a colorful clique is a clique in which every vertex has a different color. Every clique in a graph corresponds to an independent set in its complement graph. Therefore, every rainbow clique in a graph corresponds to a rainbow-independent set in its complement graph.

See also 

 Graph coloring 
 List coloring
 Rainbow coloring
 Rainbow-colorable hypergraph
 Independence complex

References 

Graph theory
Rainbow problems